Greens Creek is a stream in Crawford and Washington counties in the U.S. state of Missouri. It is a tributary of the Meramec River.

Greens Creek, formerly called Green's Branch, was named after Davey Green, a pioneer prospector.

References

Rivers of Crawford County, Missouri
Rivers of Washington County, Missouri
Rivers of Missouri